The Ouyang Yuqian Grand Theater  is a theater in Liuyang, Hunan, China. The theater, which opened in 2002, consists of 15000 square meter, including movie theater, bar, arts training centre, and teahouse. The theater was named after Chinese dramatist Ouyang Yuqian, and is used for drama, musical, and children's performances. It stands on the riverside of Liuyang River, and is backed by Tianma Mountain.

References

External links

 

Theatres in Changsha
Theatres completed in 2002
2002 establishments in China
Buildings and structures in Liuyang